Joshua Reynolds (born 1 December 1998) is a Welsh rugby union player who plays for the Dragons as a prop.

Reynolds made his debut for the Dragons in 2017 against the Scarlets in the Anglo Welsh Cup. Reynolds has also made appearances for Crosskeys RFC, Bedwas RFC, Pontypool RFC and Newport RFC. He has represented Wales at the U16, U18 and U20 level. In his youth he played for his local clubs Caerleon RFC and NHSOB RFC.

References

External links 
Dragons profile
itsrugby.co.uk profile

1998 births
Living people
Dragons RFC players
Rugby union players from Newport, Wales
Welsh rugby union players
Rugby union props